An editor-in-chief (EIC), also known as lead editor or chief editor, is a publication's editorial leader who has final responsibility for its operations and policies. 

The highest-ranking editor of a publication may also be titled editor, managing editor, or executive editor, but where these titles are held while someone else is editor-in-chief, the editor-in-chief outranks the others.

Description
The editor-in-chief heads all departments of the organization and is held accountable for delegating tasks to staff members and managing them. The term is often used at newspapers, magazines, yearbooks, and television news programs. The editor-in-chief is commonly the link between the publisher or proprietor and the editorial staff.

The term is also applied to academic journals, where the editor-in-chief gives the ultimate decision whether a submitted manuscript will be published. This decision is made by the editor-in-chief after seeking input from reviewers selected on the basis of relevant expertise. For larger journals, the decision is often upon the recommendation of one of several associate editors who each have responsibility for a fraction of the submitted manuscripts.

Typical responsibilities of editors-in-chief include:
 Ensuring that content is journalistically objective
 Fact-checking, spelling, grammar, writing style, page design and photos
 Rejecting writing that appears to be plagiarized, ghostwritten, published elsewhere, or of little interest to readers
 Evaluating and editing content
 Contributing editorial pieces
 Motivating and developing editorial staff 
 Ensuring the final draft is complete
 Handling reader complaints and taking responsibility for issues after publication
 For books and journals, cross-checking citations and examining references
 Working to advance the commercial success of the publication
 Position may involve recruiting, hiring and firing staff.

References

Further reading
 
 
 The New Fowler's Modern English Usage (3rd edn 1996, edited by R. W. Burchfield); Bryan A. Garner, Garner's Modern American Usage (2009).

External links
 
 

Types of editors
Leaders of organizations